Softsoap is the trade name of Colgate-Palmolive's liquid hand soap and body wash.

William Sheppard of New York was granted patent number 49,561 for his "Improved Liquid Soap" on August 22, 1865, for his discovery that a small amount of conventional soap could be mixed with large amounts of spirits of ammonia (or hartshorn, as it was known at the time) to create a soap with a consistency similar to that of molasses. His invention became common in public areas, but was not generally available for use in homes.

In 1980, entrepreneur Robert R. Taylor began selling pump soap under the brand name of Softsoap, through his company, The Minnetonka Corporation, located in Chaska, Minnesota. Within six months, he had sold $25 million worth of Softsoap before selling the brand to Colgate-Palmolive in 1987.

See also
 Soft soap (disambiguation)

References

External links
 
 About.com blurb
 Source/Inc.

Colgate-Palmolive brands
Products introduced in 1980
Soap brands